No Anaesthesia! is the second studio album by Finnish thrash metal band Stone, released in 1989. The album marked a slight change in sound from the band's self-titled previous album, incorporating progressive and neoclassical elements that Stone would expand on their subsequent albums, and the title track is notable for being the longest song the band ever recorded. No Anaesthesia! was remastered and re-issued in 2003, and again in 2009, when it was bundled with the preceding album in a 2-CD set. This is also the last Stone album to feature guitarist Jiri Jalkanen, who was fired from the band in 1990 and was replaced by Nirri Niiranen.

Track listing

Personnel 
 Janne Joutsenniemi – bass, vocals
 Jiri Jalkanen – guitar
 Roope Latvala – guitar
 Pekka Kasari – drums

Production
 Mikko Karmila – production

References 

1989 albums
Stone (band) albums